Aryaman ( or) is a male given name popular in parts of India. It originates from the name of the Hindu deity Aryaman, and is of Sanskrit origin.

References 

Given names
Indian given names
Hindu given names